Russ Kingston is an American film and television actor, editor, cinematographer and filmmaker.

Kingston is best known as an actor for such films as I Come with the Rain starring Josh Hartnett, Transmorphers: Fall of Man, Mega Shark Versus Giant Octopus, Guillotine Guys, Day of the Dead 2: Contagium, Dark Medicine, Bomb It and Guyver: Dark Hero.

Kingston is an editor, cinematographer and filmmaker having worked on such films as Elliott Hong's 1973 documentary Tears of Buddha, Timothy Carey's Tweet's Ladies of Pasadena, Blue Sunshine, Andrew Davis' Code of Silence, Michael Mann's Band of the Hand, Tommy Lee Wallace's Aloha Summer, Future Zone starring David Carradine, Wishman, Guyver: Dark Hero and The Lord Protector: The Riddle of the Chosen starring Patrick Cassidy, Olivia Hussey and Charlton Heston.

Kingston has acted on television series such as Aftermath with William Shatner, America's Most Wanted, General Hospital, Tim and Eric Awesome Show, Great Job!, Mystery ER and Call 911.

References

External links

American male film actors
American male television actors
21st-century American male actors
American film editors
American television editors
American cinematographers
American filmmakers
Living people
UCLA Film School alumni
Year of birth missing (living people)